The Viña Challenger is a professional tennis tournament played on clay courts. It is currently part of the Association of Tennis Professionals (ATP) Challenger Tour. It was first held in Viña del Mar, Chile in 2023.

Past finals

Singles

Doubles

References

ATP Challenger Tour
Clay court tennis tournaments
Tennis tournaments in Chile
Recurring sporting events established in 2023